A Little Madness to Be Free is the sixth album by Australian band The Saints. This time around, frontman Chris Bailey persuaded original members, Kim Bradshaw (bass) and Ivor Hay (drums), to rejoin the band. On the album tour, the bass player was Tracy Pew, formerly of The Birthday Party.  The title of the album is a reference to the quote "A person needs a little madness, or else they never dare cut the rope and be free," by Kazantzakis.  The album saw the Bailey moving further towards more ambitious arrangements including horns and strings. Bailey stated in a retrospective interview about this approach that he wanted to "make strings as powerful as Les Pauls and Marshalls".

Reception
Retrospectively, All Music gave the album a positive review writing "By this point in his career, Bailey had come into his own as an arranger and it really shows. Certainly one of their most obscure discs, but ultimately as rewarding as their classics I'm Stranded, Eternally Yours and All Fools Day.".  The Guardian cited "Ghost Ships" in their The Saints: Their Five Greatest Moments retrospective.

Track listing 
All tracks composed by Chris Bailey

The New Rose version

The French label New Rose released an alternate track listing included an extra track "Heavy Metal" and an omitting "Wrapped Up and Blue".

Personnel
Performers - Chris Bailey, Alex Hamilton, Chris Burnham, Emile Kiss, Fiona Morphett, Iain Shedden, Ivor Hay, Janine Hall, Michael Charles, Pearl Bayly, Richard Daniell, Sally Schinckel-Brown
Engineers – Tony Cohen and David Hemmings
Executive producers - Neville Bicci Henderson and Paul Comrie-Thompson 
Photography - Bob King

References

External links
[ allmusic – A Little Madness to Be Free]

The album's page from The Saints official site.

1984 albums
The Saints (Australian band) albums
Mushroom Records albums